The 2022 Piala Sumbangsih was the 37th edition of the Piala Sumbangsih, an annual football match played between the winners of the previous season's Malaysia Super League and Malaysia Cup. The match was played between Johor Darul Ta'zim, who were the champions of the 2021 Malaysia Super League, and Kuala Lumpur City, who were the winners of the 2021 Malaysia Cup. It was held at the Sultan Ibrahim Stadium in Johor.

Johor Darul Ta'zim won the match 3–0 and clinched their seventh title.

Match details

Winners

References 

Piala Sumbangsih seasons
2022 in Malaysian football